Honeysuckle (foaled 28 April 2014) a British-bred, Irish-trained Thoroughbred racehorse who competes in National Hunt races. In the 2018/19 season she was unbeaten in four races including the Boreen Belle Mares Novice Hurdle, Solerina Mares Novice Hurdle and Mares Novice Hurdle Championship Final. In the following season she compiled another perfect record, winning four times and taking the Hatton's Grace Hurdle, Irish Champion Hurdle and David Nicholson Mares' Hurdle. Another four straight wins in the 2020/21 season saw her repeat her victories in the Hatton's Grace Hurdle and the Irish Champion Hurdle before going on to win the Champion Hurdle and the Punchestown Champion Hurdle. In the 2021-22 season Honeysuckle extended her unbeaten run with further repeat victories in the Hatton's Grace Hurdle and Irish Champion Hurdle before winning a second Champion Hurdle.

Background
Honeysuckle is a bay mare with no white markings bred in England by Dr G W Guy. At the Goffs Punchestown Sale on 2018 the four-year-old filly was purchased for €100,000 by Peter Molony of Rathmore Stud. She entered the ownership of Kenneth Alexander and was sent into training with Henry de Bromhead at Knockeen, County Waterford

She was sired by Sulamani, a top-class international turf horse whose wins included the Prix du Jockey Club, Dubai Sheema Classic, Arlington Million, Juddmonte International Stakes and Canadian International Stakes. The best of his progeny included Mastery and Rule The World. Honeysuckle's dam First Royal showed modest racing ability, winning one minor race from ten attempts in her native Germany. First Royal's grand-dam First Smile was a half-sister to the German St. Leger winner First Hello.

Racing career

2018/2019 National Hunt season
Honeysuckle began her racing career on the amateur Point-to-point circuit, winning a maiden race for four-year-old mares at Dromahane on 22 April 2018. She made her debut under National Hunt rules on 14 November when she started the 9/10 favourite for a mares' Novice Hurdle over two and a half miles at Fairyhouse. Ridden as in most of her subsequent races by Rachael Blackmore she disputed the lead from the start, drew away over the last two flights of hurdles and won "easily" by twelve lengths from Moskovite and six others. The mare was then moved up in class for the Listed Boreen Belle Mares Novice Hurdle over two miles at Thurles Racecourse on 22 December and recorded another easy victory, leading from the start and coming home three and a quarter lengths clear of Sassy Diva.

The Grade 3 Solerina Mares Novice Hurdle over two and a quarter miles at Fairyhouse in January saw Honeysuckle go off the 6/4 favourite against six opponents. After racing in third place she took the lead approaching the second last flight and extended her advantage to win by six lengths from Western Victory despite a minor jumping error at the last obstacle. The mare missed an intended run at the Cheltenham Festival after performing poorly in training gallops: De Bromhead reported that she "went a bit flat and we weren't happy with her". For her final appearance of the season Honeysuckle was elevated to the highest class on 21 April at Fairyhouse and started 6/4 favourite for the Grade 1 Mares Novice Hurdle Championship Final, with the best fancied of her 21 opponents being the Dawn Run Mares' Novices' Hurdle winner Eglantine du Seuil. After racing just behind the leaders Honeysuckle went to the front after the third last and won by five and a half lengths from Elfile with Eglantine du Seuil three lengths back in third. After the race De Bromhead said "She's some five-year-old and has achieved so much already... and is a really exciting mare. Rachael said she just wanted to keep it simple. She got a lovely position and had her jumping great. I said to her beforehand that you don't need to drive on too early, but then I saw her taking a pull after the second last and said you can drive on now all right!"

2019/2020 National Hunt season
On her first appearance of the new season, Honeysuckle was matched against male opposition for the first time in a two and a half mile hurdle at Fairyhouse on 12 November when she started the odds-on favourite and won by eleven lengths from the Navan Novice Hurdle winner Easy Game. Nineteen days later, over the same course and distance, the mare was stepped back up to Grade I class for the Hatton's Grace Hurdle and went off the 9/10 favourite in a six-runner field which included Apple's Jade, Bacardys (Champion Novice Hurdle), Penhill and Killultagh Vic (Irish Daily Mirror Novice Hurdle). Honeysuckle raced in third place behind Killultagh Vic and Apple's Jade before taking the lead before taking the lead at the penultimate flight and drawing away to win by nine lengths from Bacardys. After the race Blackmore commented "She’s very special and this was a big step up today. Sitting on her back is a privileged position to be in... I hope she loves the place across the water as well!" while De Bromhead said "She was brilliant and even I could enjoy it a bit. I couldn’t believe it when Rachael took a pull on her turning in considering the calibre of race she was in... She’s grown and developed over the summer".

The Irish Champion Hurdle at Leopardstown Racecourse on 1 February saw Honeysuckle dropped back in distance to two miles and start the 8/11 favourite. Her eight opponents included Sharjah (Matheson Hurdle), Petit Mouchoir (winner of the race in 2017), Supasundae (Aintree Hurdle) and Aramon (Future Champions Novice Hurdle). The mare raced in second place behind Petit Mouchoir for most of the way before taking the lead approaching the last obstacle. An awkward jump at the last allowed Petit Mouchoir to briefly regain the lead but Honeysuckle rallied strongly and held off the challenge of the outsider Darver Star in the final strides to win by half a length. Blackmore said "She's got a massive heart and a massive will to do it... She's always done everything I've asked her to do and I wasn't too worried about coming back in trip."

Honeysuckle made her first appearance outside Ireland on 10 March when she contested the David Nicholson Mares' Hurdle at Cheltenham. For the first time she did not start favourite, going off the 9/4 second choice in the betting behind the French Champion Hurdle winner Benie de Dieux. The other seven runners included Roksana and Stormy Ireland who had finished first and second in the race in 2019. Honeysuckle was in contention from the start as Stormy Ireland set the pace, and moved up on the inside to take the lead on the final turn only to be challenged by Benie des Dieux. The two favourites drew away from their rivals with Honeysuckle staying on well to win by half a length with a gap of six and a half lengths back to Elfile in third. Henry de Bromhead said "She really toughed it out up the hill. She gets from A to B over her hurdles and that's it. We never try to find out too much at home. She really battled and threw herself at the last. Whatever about the mare, the lady on her back is something special - the pair of them are brilliant."

Pedigree

References

2014 racehorse births
Racehorses bred in the United Kingdom
Racehorses trained in Ireland
Thoroughbred family 16-c
Champion Hurdle winners